Eqbaliyeh (also Romanized as Eqbālīyeh) is a village in Takht-e Jolgeh Rural District, in the Central District of Firuzeh County, Razavi Khorasan Province, Iran. At the 2006 census, its population was 424, in 111 families.

References 

Populated places in Firuzeh County